It's Five O'Clock Somewhere is the debut studio album by American hard rock band Slash's Snakepit, released in February 1995. The album was a moderate commercial success, reaching number 70 on the American Billboard 200 album chart and selling over a million copies worldwide. The songs "Beggars & Hangers-On" and "Good to Be Alive" were released as singles and promo videos were made for each track.

The album was recorded as Guns N' Roses, Saul "Slash" Hudson's main group at the time, were struggling to come to agreement on musical style on their next album. Slash's Guns N' Roses bandmates Matt Sorum, Dizzy Reed, Gilby Clarke as well as associate Teddy Andreadis all contributed to the album. Sorum stated that it "could have been a Guns N' Roses album, but [lead singer] Axl [Rose] didn't think it was good enough".

Track listing

Personnel                                                                 
                 

Slash's Snakepit
Slash – lead and rhythm guitars, slide guitar, backing vocals, production
Eric Dover – lead vocals
Gilby Clarke – rhythm guitar, backing vocals
Mike Inez – bass, backing vocals
Matt Sorum – drums, backing vocals
Additional musicians
Dizzy Reed – keyboards, backing vocals
Teddy Andreadis – harmonica
Paulinho da Costa – percussion

Production personnel
Mike Clink – production, engineering
Steve Thompson – mixing
Michael Barbiero – mixing
Jerry Finn – engineering
John Radzin – engineering
Rick Raponi – engineering
Robbes Steiglitz – engineering
Shawn Berman – engineering
Jay Ryan – additional engineering
Noel Golden – additional engineering
George Marino – mastering

Miscellaneous
The album cover artwork has been released by ConArt, a graphic company owned by Slash's brother, the art direction was done by Tony Hudson, Slash, and Kevin Reagan and the photos were done by Gene Kirkland and Robert John. 
"Be the Ball" was written by Slash upon the request of Data East, a company who sells pin ball machines.
The band also worked on three more songs that have neither been released nor been played live.

Charts

Certifications

References

Other sources

1995 debut albums
Slash's Snakepit albums
Albums produced by Mike Clink
Geffen Records albums